Eriocottis flavicephalana is a moth in the family Eriocottidae. It was described by Syuti Issiki in 1930. It is found in Taiwan.

References

Moths described in 1930
Eriocottidae
Moths of Taiwan